Sons and Daughters is an American comedy-drama television series created by Brad Buckner and Eugenie Ross-Leming, that aired on CBS from January 4 until March 1, 1991.

It was originally planning on to premiere on October 25, 1990, but it was shelved at the last minute.

Premise
A single mother raises her adoptive daughter while trying to maintain harmony among other family members.

Cast
Lucie Arnaz as Tess Hammersmith
Michelle Wong as Astrid Hammersmith
Peggy Smithhart as Patty Hammersmith Lincoln
Rick Rossovich as Spud Lincoln
Paul Scherrer as Rocky Lincoln
Kamie Harper as Paulette Lincoln
Billy O'Sullivan as Ike Lincoln
Scott Plank as Gary Hammersmith
Stacy Edwards as Lindy Hammersmith
Don Murray as Bing Hammersmith
Aaron Brownstein as Bing Hammersmith, Jr.
George D. Wallace as Hank Hammersmith
Lisa Blount as Mary Ruth Hammersmith

Episodes

References

External links
 
TV Guide
epguides.com

1991 American television series debuts
1991 American television series endings
1990s American comedy-drama television series
English-language television shows
CBS original programming
Television series by CBS Studios
Television shows set in Portland, Oregon